, stylized as [Alexandros] is a Japanese rock band, signed to RX-Records and managed by UK Project. On March 28, 2014, the band renamed to [Alexandros] from [Champagne] on request from Bureau du Champagne, Japan.

On November 28, 2014, it was announced that the band would be signed to Universal Music Japan, starting from their single  that was released in 2015. Subsequent album and singles since 2015 have been released by Universal Music Japan.

In 2016, the band performed at the SXSW Music Festival as part of the Japan Nite showcase.

In 2018, their song "Mosquito Bite" was used as the theme for the live-action film adaptation of Bleach. That same year, the band also contributed the theme song ("Arpeggio") and ending theme ("Your Song") to the Sega video game Judgment. A year later in 2019, their song "PRAY" was used as the theme for the Japanese dub of the MonsterVerse film Godzilla: King of the Monsters.

From 2020 to 2021, the band's lead vocalist Yoohei Kawakami was a guest vocalist of two songs by Tokyo Ska Paradise Orchestra for the Japanese Tokusatsu drama Kamen Rider Saber.

Band members
Current members
  — vocals, guitar (2007–present)
  — bass guitar, backing vocals (2007–present)
  — guitar (2007–present)
 Ib Riad — drums (2021–present)

Former members
  — drums (2007–2010)
  — drums (2010–2021)

Support Members
 ROSE — keyboard (Original Group: THE LED SNAIL)

Timeline

Appearances

TV Variety Appearance 

 Welcome! [Alexandros] ( Formerly known as: Welcome! [Champagne] ) (June 2013 – March 2017, Space Shower TV )

Radio Appearance 

 SBS PopAsia 「J-Rock Sessions with [Alexandros]」with Yoohei and Hiro (September 2015 – June 2016, Australia SBS) 
 SCHOOL OF LOCK! (October 2015 ~ Present, Tokyo FM) – Yoohei as "Kawakami-sensei" on the Tuesday Regular Corner「AlexandroLOCKS!」

Movie 

 Kyou no Kira-kun (February 25, 2017) – Yoohei as an English Teacher, Cameo Appearance

Advertising 

 Apparel Brand 「glamb」 (2015–2016) – Yoohei as a model for the Spring Collection

CMs 

 NTT DOCOMO「DOCOMO's Student Discount 『Ayanoxandros？』」(2017)
 Tokyo Metro 「Find My Tokyo. 『Asakusa – Fun continues to live』」(2018)

Discography

Studio albums

Singles

DVD Releases

Awards and nominations 
Japan Gold Disc Award

|-
| 2016
| [Alexandros]
| New Artist of the Year
| 
|}

MTV Video Music Awards Japan

|-
| 2016
| "Swan"
| Best Rock Video
| 
|}

Space Shower Music Awards

|-
| 2016
| [Alexandros]
| Best Rock Artist
| 
|-
| 2017
| [Alexandros]
| People's choice
| 
|-
| 2019
| [Alexandros]
| Best Group Artist
| 
|}

Tours and concerts

Japan 
 Rock in Japan Festival with Various Artists (2010)
 Summer Sonic Festival with Various Artists (2010)
 Rock in Japan Festival with Various Artists (2011)
 Summer Sonic Festival with Various Artists (2011)
 Kasabian Japan Tour with [Champagne] as supporting act (2012)
 Rock in Japan Festival with Various Artists (2012)
 Rising Sun Rock Festival with Various Artists (2012)
 Muse Japan Tour with [Champagne] as supporting act (2013)
 Primal Scream Japan Tour with [Champagne] as supporting act (2013)
 Summer Sonic Festival with Various Artists (2013)
 Fuji Rock Festival with Various Artists (2015)
 Summer Sonic Festival with Various Artists (2016)

Overseas 
 The Great Escape Festival in UK with Various Artists (2013)
 SXSW Music Festival in US with Various Artists (2014)

See also
 Japanese rock

References

External links 

 Official website

Japanese rock music groups
Japanese alternative rock groups